KXEQ (1340 AM) is a radio station broadcasting a Regional Mexican format. Licensed to Reno, Nevada, United States, it serves the Reno area.  The station is currently owned by Azteca Broadcasting Corporation.

History

KATO
Reno got its second radio station when KATO signed on for the first time on July 9, 1946. Owned by the Sierra Broadcasting Company, KATO was a Don Lee/Mutual affiliate and broadcast with 250 watts from a transmitter at Sixth and Cassinella streets on the eastern edge of town. Robert Stoddard, the station's founding general manager, bought out Sierra Broadcasting in 1953 for $47,600.

KATO was approved in 1958 to relocate its transmitter to a site east of town.

KBET
On May 28, 1959, KATO became KBET. Later that year, tragedy struck when 43-year-old newscaster and account executive Ernie Ferguson committed suicide on Thanksgiving. Stoddard's Comstock Telecasting Corporation made an application for television channel 4 in Reno in 1960; while it was not selected, KBET did increase its power to 1,000 watts in 1961. It broadcast from studios at the Mapes Hotel downtown after having gone on the air from the basement of an Elks lodge.

KBET was fined $5,000 by the Federal Communications Commission in 1971 for fraudulent billing practices that allowed an appliance distributor to double-bill its suppliers.

Stoddard died in July 1975 of a heart attack while golfing in northern California; he was remembered for his folksy local newscasts and involvement in local high school sports. The First National Bank of Nevada took control of the KBET license and sold the country music outlet to the highest bidder the next year: Sierra Broadcasting, owned by Bob and Julie Day and Royce Adams.

After an attempt to sell the license to Sterling Broadcasting in 1980 fell through, KBET was sold the next year to Reno Electronics, owned by former KOLO radio-TV general manager Stan Weisberger; the new ownership retained KBET's country format but sought to relocate the studios and acquire new equipment. However, by 1984, the station had flipped to oldies, perhaps because Reno had five country stations, and the next year it went in a middle-of-the-road direction and branded as "KBEST".

KRCV
1986 saw the sale of KBET and its Las Vegas sister, KNUU, to Doug and Christina Trenner's CAT Broadcasting for $2.1 million. A major format change followed: in May 1987, the station became KRCV, "Reno's Christian Voice"—the city's only Christian radio station. Although KRCV did not make money, a coalition of 75 business leaders, pastors and station listeners mounted an effort to buy the station outright the next year, with Trenner's blessing. In addition to its religious programming, KRCV presented Reno Silver Sox baseball and high school football broadcasts.

KXEQ
However, by 1991, KRCV was silent and CAT Broadcasting had filed for bankruptcy. As a debtor-in-possession, it sold KRCV to Rolando Collantes, owner of KSVN in Ogden, Utah and KGEN in Tulare, California, for $30,000 in 1991. KXEQ debuted on 1340 AM on December 14, 1991, as "La Super Q", with studios in a converted house on Linden Street.

In 2014, KXEQ began broadcasting the Alex "El Genio" Lucas syndicated morning show.

References

External links

XEQ
1946 establishments in Nevada
Radio stations established in 1946